Batugedara is a small town in the Sabaragamuwa Province of southwestern Sri Lanka, located just to the east of the province's capital of Ratnapura. It is most notable as a source for gemstones, and as a destination for tourism.

Maps 
 Batugedara in map of Sri Lanka

Populated places in Sabaragamuwa Province